Winston Yap was a former Singapore international football player who last played for Woodlands Wellington in the S-League. 

He retired in 2010 to pursue a career in coaching, making it his third and final retirement from professional football.

Club career
Previously, he played for Tampines Rovers and Gombak United.  

He retired twice, from 2005 & 2009.  However, he made a comeback with Gombak United & Woodlands Wellington F.C.

He won four S.League titles, three with SAFFC in 1997, 1998, and 2002, and one with Geylang United in 2001.

International career
He played twice for the National Squad in 2002 and has not played for it since.

External links

1976 births
Living people
Singaporean footballers
Singapore international footballers
Singaporean sportspeople of Chinese descent
Geylang International FC players
Association football defenders
Tampines Rovers FC players
Warriors FC players
Balestier Khalsa FC players
Gombak United FC players
Hougang United FC players
Woodlands Wellington FC players
Singapore Premier League players